Texania campestris is a species in the family Buprestidae ("metallic wood-boring beetles"), in the suborder Polyphaga ("water, rove, scarab, long-horned, leaf and snout beetles"). The species is known generally as the "hardwood heartwood buprestid".
It is found in North America.

References

Further reading
 "A catalog and bibliography of the Buprestoidea of America north of Mexico", Nelson et al. 2008. The Coleopterists Society, Special Publication No. 4. 274 pp.
 Arnett, R. H. Jr., M. C. Thomas, P. E. Skelley and J. H. Frank. (eds.). (21 June 2002). American Beetles, Volume II: Polyphaga: Scarabaeoidea through Curculionoidea. CRC Press LLC, Boca Raton, Florida .
 Arnett, Ross H. (2000). American Insects: A Handbook of the Insects of America North of Mexico. CRC Press.
 Bellamy, C.L. (2008-2009). A World Catalogue and Bibliography of the Jewel Beetles (Coleoptera: Buprestoidea), Volumes 1-5. Pensoft Series Faunistica No. 76-80.
 Nelson, Gayle H., George C. Walters Jr., R. Dennis Haines, and Charles L. Bellamy (2008). "A Catalog and Bibliography of the Buprestoidea of America North of Mexico". The Coleopterists' Society, Special Publication, no. 4, iv + 274.
 Richard E. White. (1983). Peterson Field Guides: Beetles. Houghton Mifflin Company.

Buprestidae
Beetles described in 1823